Whitewood, was a territorial electoral district in the Northwest Territories of Canada from 1887 to 1905. The district was created from the former district of Broadview, prior to the 1888 general election.

This district was the first to use a secret ballot. During the 1894 By-election, ballots were first used in this electoral district.  The territory went to using colored pencils on paper to count ballots, except someone forgot the pencil for the Candidate William Clements at the Fairmede polling station, and one had to be sent out from the Chief electoral office in Regina.  Fred Chamberlain, the local liveryman, drove his horse and carriage twenty-five miles through a raging blizzard to deliver a new pencil and arrived just before the polls opened.

After the province of Saskatchewan split from the Northwest Territories in 1905, Whitewood continued to exist as a district in Saskatchewan until 1908.

Election results

1894 – 1902

1888 – 1894 

Note: Vote returns not complete for the 1894 By-election. Returns only include the polls from Whitewood and Broadview, they do not include the rural stations. As reported in the Lethbridge Herald February 22, 1894. The Broadview and Whitewood polls were announced by the returning officer on February 16, 1894, and the rural vote was announced February 17, 1894 but was not printed.

By-election reasons 
February 16, 1894: Daniel Campbell's expulsion from the Council after he was accused of forgery and embezzlement, and fled the country.

References

External links 
Personnel of the Northwest Territories Assembly 1888 – 1905

Former electoral districts of Northwest Territories